The Kudzu DG-1 is an IMSA GTP Lights sports prototype race car, designed, developed and built by American racing driver Jim Downing; making its debut in 1989. It competed in the IMSA GT Championship between 1989 and 1993. It was powered by either a Mazda 13B Wankel rotary engine, or a Buick V6 engine. Its best result was a 5th-place finish, and it achieved 4 class wins.

References

Sports prototypes
IMSA GTP cars